George Glendon (born 3 May 1995) is an English professional footballer who plays for Chester as a midfielder.

Early and personal life
He is the son of former professional footballer Kevin Glendon.

Club career

Manchester City
He began his career at Manchester City, where he was captain of their Elite Development Squad.

Fleetwood Town
He signed on loan for Fleetwood Town in August 2016, with the deal becoming permanent in January 2017. Glendon was released by Fleetwood at the end of the 2017–18 season.

Carlisle United
Glendon joined Carlisle United in July 2018 after signing a one-year contract. He scored his first professional goal in a 3-2 EFL Trophy win over Morecambe on 4 September 2018.

He was released by Carlisle at the end of the 2018–19 season.

Chester
In August 2019 he joined Chester on a short-term deal. On 8 February 2021, Glendon was awarded the Player of the Month award for the league for January 2021.

International career
He represented England at youth international level, and he was called up to the Wales under-21 team in March 2015.

Honours
National League North Player of the Month: January 2021

Career statistics

References

1995 births
Living people
English footballers
English people of Welsh descent
Footballers from Manchester
Manchester City F.C. players
Fleetwood Town F.C. players
Carlisle United F.C. players
Chester F.C. players
Association football midfielders
English Football League players
National League (English football) players
England youth international footballers